Kevin Michael Meacock (born 16 September 1963) is an English former professional footballer who played as a forward. He made 25 appearances in the Football League for Cardiff City and played for several clubs on Australia and New Zealand.

Career
Born in Bristol, Meacock began his career with his hometown club Bristol City. In his only season with the first team, the club won promotion to the Third Division although Meacock made no appearances for the side. Following his release, Meacock moved to New Zealand where he played for Gisborne City, helping the club win the New Zealand National Soccer League and reach the final of the Chatham Cup where they suffered a 2–1 defeat to Manurewa.

He returned to Britain soon after and, after a brief spell with non-league Devizes Town, he signed for Cardiff City along with his former Gisborne teammate Paul McLoughlin. He made his professional debut on 15 December 1984 as a substitute during a 3–1 defeat to Wimbledon before scoring his first goals with a brace during a 2–1 victory over Middlesbrough two months later. However, he scored only one further goal during the remainder of the season and the following year he was released after losing his place in the first team.

He later moved to Australia playing for several clubs in the National Soccer League and the Queensland State League as well as returning for a second spell with Gisborne City.

Meacock currently owns and operates a football academy based in Brisbane, Australia called Respect Football. The academy is based around inclusion within sport no matter your story or background. Being a strong believer in developing kids skills at a young age, the academy aims to work with kids from the age of 5 and up.

Later life
Meacock moved to Brisbane where he began coaching youth football.

Honours
Gisborne City
 New Zealand National Soccer League winner: 1984
 Chatham Cup runner-up: 1984

References

1963 births
Living people
Footballers from Bristol
English footballers
Bristol City F.C. players
Gisborne City AFC players
Devizes Town F.C. players
Cardiff City F.C. players
St George FC players
Brisbane Strikers FC players
English Football League players
Association football forwards
Expatriate association footballers in New Zealand
Expatriate soccer players in Australia